Mangrove Institute of Science and Technology, also known as MIST, is a private polytechnic Institute located in Khulna, Bangladesh. The institute offers diploma courses in engineering programs and short TVET courses. It is affiliated with the Bangladesh Technical Education Board and is dedicated to providing quality education and training to its students.

History 
Mangrove Institute of Science and Technology was established on June 26, 2005. Since then, the Institute has been committed to providing quality education and training in engineering and technology to its students.

Academics 
Mangrove Institute of Science and Technology offers 4-year diploma courses in 15 different technologies, along with short  for those seeking to further their skills and expertise. The Institute has a team of experienced faculty members who are dedicated to ensuring that the students receive a well-rounded education and hands-on training that prepares them for successful careers in their chosen fields.

Campus and Facilities 
The Mangrove Institute of Science and Technology campus is located in the Boikali area of Khulna, Bangladesh. The institute has a multistoried building equipped with modern facilities and infrastructure. The campus has spacious classrooms, computer labs, and a well-stocked library. The computer software lab and library of the institute are well-equipped with modern resources and technologies. The institute also has an auditorium, a cafeteria, and a sports ground for the overall development of students.

The institute provides hostel facilities for both male and female students. The hostel rooms are well-furnished and equipped with modern amenities such as Wi-Fi, study tables, and chairs. The hostel also has a common room with a TV and other entertainment facilities.

Hostels 

Mangrove Institute of Science and Technology operates 10 modern and well-equipped hostels to accommodate students. The hostels are located within the campus, providing easy access to academic and other facilities. The hostels provide a comfortable and homely atmosphere for students.

Each hostel accommodates up to 160 students and is equipped with modern facilities, including Wi-Fi, 24/7 security, and regular cleaning services. The rooms are spacious and well-ventilated, and each room is furnished with beds, study tables, and wardrobes.

The Institute provides a variety of dining options for students in the hostels, including a canteen, cafeteria, and mess, serving a variety of healthy and nutritious meals, including vegetarian and non-vegetarian options.

The hostel facilities are managed by a team of dedicated staff members who are available 24/7 to provide assistance and support to the students. The Institute is committed to providing a safe and secure environment for its students, and the hostel facilities are monitored round the clock by security personnel.

The Institute has a dedicated hostel committee composed of student representatives and staff members, which oversees the functioning of the hostels and ensures that the needs of the students are met.

Overall, the hostel facilities at Mangrove Institute of Science and Technology provide a comfortable and supportive living environment for its students, helping them to focus on their academic pursuits and achieve their goals.

Lab Facilities 

At Mangrove Institute of Science and Technology, students have access to 35 labs with modern equipment to facilitate practical and hands-on learning experiences. The labs are designed to provide a conducive environment for students to experiment and learn, helping them to gain practical skills and apply theoretical knowledge in real-life scenarios.

The lab facilities cover a wide range of subjects, including physics, chemistry, biology, electronics, computer science, and engineering. Each lab is equipped with state-of-the-art instruments and tools, ensuring that students have access to the latest technologies and equipment.

The lab facilities are managed by a team of experienced lab technicians, who ensure that the equipment is well-maintained and students have access to the necessary resources to conduct experiments and carry out research.

Research and Development 

As one of Bangladesh's leading research polytechnic institutes, Mangrove Institute of Science and Technology is committed to providing a platform for innovative and cutting-edge research. The institute's research initiatives aim to solve the most significant challenges in online learning through personalised learning, innovative science and technology.

The institute is amongst the first private polytechnic institutes that are working towards creating a globally recognised online learning research hub in Bangladesh. It brings together educational institutions, industry, government, and not-for-profit organisations from around the world to work collaboratively towards solving the most pressing challenges in online learning.

The current research interests of the institute involve Artificial Intelligence (AI), e-Learning, Internet of Things (IoT), Cybersecurity, Blockchain, technology, and family-school partnerships. The institute prioritises solving the big challenges together, with a focus on interdisciplinary research.

If you need an independent and expert opinion on your Research Grant Application or Research Paper, the institute offers research-related services such as research plan and strategy development, methodology development, technical writing, and more. Contact the institute today for an obligation-free chat to know more about the services offered.

Production Units 

Mangrove Institute of Science and Technology has its own manufacturing units to provide students with hands-on experience in the production process, helping them to gain practical skills and apply theoretical knowledge in real-life scenarios.

The institute's production units cover a wide range of subjects, including engineering, electronics, and computer science. Each unit is equipped with state-of-the-art instruments and tools, ensuring that students have access to the latest technologies and equipment.

Experienced technicians manage the institute's production units to ensure that the equipment is well-maintained, and students have access to the necessary resources to carry out the production process.

Workshops 

To facilitate practical learning and skill development, Mangrove Institute of Science and Technology has an exclusive setup of workshops with modern equipment. The workshops are designed to provide a conducive environment for students to experiment and learn, helping them to gain practical skills and apply theoretical knowledge in real-life scenarios.

The institute's workshop facilities cover a wide range of subjects, including carpentry, welding, and fabrication. Each workshop is equipped with state-of-the-art instruments and tools, ensuring that students have access to the latest technologies and equipment.

Experienced technicians manage the institute's workshops to ensure that the equipment is well-maintained, and students have access to the necessary resources to carry out the production process.

Library 

Mangrove Institute of Science and Technology has a well-equipped, air-conditioned library with 6,000 textbooks and 1,000 reference books. The library is designed to provide a conducive environment for students to study and conduct research, providing them with the necessary resources to excel in their academic pursuits.

The library has a wide range of books covering a variety of subjects, including science, engineering, humanities, and social sciences. It also provides access to online databases, e-books, and other digital resources, making it easier for students to access information quickly and efficiently.

The library has a team of trained staff members who are available to assist students in finding the resources they need, as well as providing guidance on how to use the library's various tools and services. The library is open from 8 am to 5 pm every day, and students can borrow books for up to two weeks, with the option to renew their loans if needed.

In addition to the physical library, the Institute also provides online access to its vast collection of digital resources. Students can access these resources from anywhere with an internet connection, allowing them to continue their research and studies outside of the campus.

The library also hosts a range of events and activities throughout the year, such as book clubs, author talks, and workshops, to encourage a love for reading and a culture of learning among the students.

Overall, the library at Mangrove Institute of Science and Technology is an essential resource for students, providing them with access to a vast collection of resources and a supportive environment for their academic pursuits.

Faculty and Staff 

The Mangrove Institute of Science and Technology has a team of experienced and dedicated faculty members who are experts in their respective fields. The faculty members are committed to providing quality education and training to the students. The institute also has a team of administrative staff who work tirelessly to ensure the smooth functioning of the institute.

As of 2023, the institute has around 125 academic staff and 20 administrative staff.

Notable Achievements 
The Mangrove Institute of Science and Technology has a track record of providing quality education and training to its students. The institute's students have consistently achieved outstanding results in their respective fields, with many going on to successful careers in various industries.

In 2021 and 2022, the institute received the "Best Private Polytechnic Institute" award from the Bangladesh Technical Education Board for its outstanding contribution to the field of technical education.

Community 
Mangrove Institute of Science and Technology is committed to fostering a supportive and inclusive community where the students can grow and flourish. The Institute takes pride in its alumni who are making an impact in industries all around the world.

See also 
 Khulna Polytechnic Institute
 Dhaka Polytechnic Institute
 Chittagong Polytechnic Institute
 Dinajpur Polytechnic Institute
 Faridpur Polytechnic Institute
 Feni Polytechnic Institute
 Bogra Polytechnic Institute
 Chandpur Polytechnic Institute
 Jessore Polytechnic Institute

References

External links 

 Official Website

Colleges in Bangladesh
Technological institutes of Bangladesh
Polytechnic institutes in Khulna Division
Educational institutions of Khulna District
Educational institutions established in 2005
2005 establishments in Bangladesh